Nuy is a village in West Azerbaijan Province, Iran.

Nuy may also refer to:

 Nuy River, Western Cape, South Africa, dammed by the Keerom Dam
 Annelies Nuy (born 1960), Dutch fashion designer
 Nunggubuyu language (ISO 639: nuy)

See also

 Van Nuys (disambiguation)